Sybase, Inc. was an enterprise software and services company. The company produced software relating to relational databases, with facilities located in California and Massachusetts. Sybase was acquired by SAP in 2010; SAP ceased using the Sybase name in 2014.

History
1984: Robert Epstein, Mark Hoffman, Jane Doughty, and Tom Haggin founded Sybase (initially trading as Systemware) in Epstein's home in Berkeley, California. Their first commercial location is half of an office suite at 2107 Dwight Way in Berkeley. They set out to create a relational database management system (RDBMS) that will organize information and make it available to computers within a network.
March 1986: Systemware enters into talks with Microsoft to license Data Server, a database product built to run on UNIX computers.  Those talks led to a product called Ashton-Tate/Microsoft SQL Server 1.0, shipping in May 1989.
May 1991: Systemware changes its name to Sybase.
January 1998: Sybase announced that it had found inconsistencies in profits reporting from its Japanese division and would restate the financial results for the company for the last three quarters of 1997. Five executives in Sybase's Japanese subsidiary were found to have used side letters to artificially inflate the profits from their operations. Following a class-action lawsuit, the five executives involved were fired.
November 1998: John S. Chen is appointed Chairman, CEO, and President.
2007: Sybase crossed the $1 billion revenue mark.
March 2009: Sybase and SAP partner to deliver the SAP Business Suite software to iPhone, Windows Mobile, BlackBerry, and other devices.
May 2009: Sybase begins packaging MicroStrategy business intelligence software with its Sybase IQ server.
September 2009: Sybase and Verizon partner to manage mobility services for enterprises worldwide through Verizon's Managed Mobility Solutions, which uses Sybase's enterprise device management platform.
May 2010: SAP and Sybase, Inc. announced SAP America, Inc. had signed a definitive merger agreement to acquire Sybase, Inc. for all of the outstanding shares of Sybase common stock representing an enterprise value of approximately $5.8 billion.
July 2010: SAP AG announced it had completed the acquisition of Sybase, Inc., with Sybase as a wholly owned subsidiary of SAP America.
October 2012: All Sybase employees are incorporated into SAP's workforce. On October 30, 2012, SAP announced Sybase, Inc. CEO and President John S. Chen was leaving Sybase, effective on October 31, 2012, after leading Sybase for 15 years.

See also
 Adaptive Server Enterprise

References

 
SAP SE acquisitions
Companies based in Alameda County, California
Software companies established in 1984
1984 establishments in California
Defunct software companies of the United States
Dublin, California
Defunct companies based in the San Francisco Bay Area
Software companies based in the San Francisco Bay Area
Data companies
2010 mergers and acquisitions
American subsidiaries of foreign companies